Steve Webster MBE (born 7 January 1960), is an English sidecar racer who has won six FIM Sidecar World Championships and four world cup, making him the most successful sidecar racer ever.

Career
Born in Easingwold, North Yorkshire, Webster began as a 19-year-old racing at club level, first racing at the Elvington Airfield circuit near York, and quickly moved up to national and then world championship in 1983, winning his first world championship in 1987 while partnered with Tony Hewitt, riding an LCR-Yamaha machine. From 181 Grand Prix and World Cup races entered, he has had 62 wins, 37 second places and 27 third places as well as 82 pole positions. He has won the FIM Sidecar World Championship on 10 occasions (1987, 1988, 1989, 1991, 1997, 1998, 1999, 2000, 2003, and 2004), with Tony Hewitt, Gavin Simmons, David James and Paul Woodhead. 

In 1985 Webster and Hewitt had a massive crash at the Dutch TT at Assen, shown many times on television where the sidecar left the track at high speed, slid along the grass before hitting a drainage ditch. The accident caused the pair to miss most of the season.

Webster was the recipient of the Segrave Trophy in 1991. The same year, he was awarded the MBE.

In 2004 Webster won British, European, and World titles, but in 2005 Webster announced his retirement after health problems prevented him finishing the season.

In 2006, Webster received a Lifetime Achievement Award from the Auto Cycle Union.

In 2015, Webster was reunited with Hewitt on track, the pair taking part in a test event at Mallory Park.

References

Living people
English motorcycle racers
Members of the Order of the British Empire
Segrave Trophy recipients
1960 births
Sidecar racers
People from Easingwold